Ashwini Ekbote (March 22, 1972 – October 22, 2016) was an Indian theatre and screen actress and a classical dancer. She began her acting career in the Marathi theatre.

Career
Ekbote had done several Marathi plays and had been a part of many regional language based entertainment serials. Ashwini was actively involved in women empowerment and environmental issues. She was running a dance training class and very often conducted free of charge shows.

Personal life
Ekbote was born as Ashwini Katkar. She is married to Pramod Ekbote, who is a senior radio technician with the Pune Fire Brigade, working with them for the past 25 years. They have one son named Subhankar. Her brother is also a stage and film actor. Her son Shubhankar Ekbote is also making career in the film industry. Shubhankar has made debut with film Mantr.

Death
Ekbote died on 22 October 2016 after collapsing on stage during a performance in Pune at Bharat Natya Mandir.

Filmography

Marathi movies
 Mahasatta महासत्ता
 Debu डेबू 
 Vacation वेकेशन
 Dankyavar Danka डंक्यावर डंका 
 Taptapadi तप्तपदी 
 Majha Naav Shivaji माझं नाव शिवाजी 
 Bho Bho भो भो
 FU: Friendship Unlimited एफयू: फ्रेंडशिप अनलिमिटेड
 Coffee Ani Barach Kahi कॉफी आणि बरंच काही  
 Radio Nights 6.06 रेडिओ नाइटस् ६.०६
 Mahaguru महागुरु
 Baware Prem He बावरे प्रेम हे (2017)
 Aarambh आरंभ
 Kshan Ha Mohacha क्षण हा मोहाचा (2008)
 Bhulwa (2007) as Ria
 Ek Pal Pyaar Ka (Hindi) एक पल प्यार का
 Sant Janabai संत जनाबाई

Marathi Plays
 Tighanchi Gosht तिघांची गोष्ट
 Eka Kshanat एका क्षणात
 Nandi नांदी

Television
 Duheri दुहेरी
 Durva दुर्वा
 Radha Hi Bawari राधा ही बावरी
 Tu Bhetshi Navyane तू भेटशी नव्याने
 Ahilyabai Holkar अहिल्याबाई होळकर
 Arundhati अरुंधती
 Unch Majha Jhoka उंच माझा झोका
 Asambhav असंभव
 Man Udhan Varyache मन उधाण वाऱ्याचे
 Tujvin Sakhya Re तुजवीण सख्या रे
Fu Bai Fu फू बाई फू

References

1972 births
2016 deaths
20th-century Indian actresses
21st-century Indian actresses
Indian film actresses
Indian television actresses
Actresses in Marathi cinema
Actresses in Hindi cinema
Actresses from Pune
Actresses in Hindi television